Medumi is a settlement in Medumi Parish, Augšdaugava Municipality in the Selonia region of Latvia.

References

External links 
Satellite map at Maplandia.com

Towns and villages in Latvia
Augšdaugava Municipality
Latvia–Lithuania border crossings
Selonia